Joem may refer to:
 Joem Bascon (born 1986), Filipino actor
 Journal of Occupational and Environmental Medicine, peer-reviewed monthly journal
 Joem, the only survivor of the British NER Class E1 steam locomotives